Sirmaur district is the southernmost district of Himachal Pradesh, northern India. It is largely mountainous and rural, with 90% of its population living in villages. Some of its towns include the capital  Nahan, 
Tuheri, Bhawan, Shamra, UchaTikker and Suketi, the latter known for Shivalik Fossil Park.

Geography
There are seven tehsils in this district: Nahan, Renuka, Kamrau, Shillai, Rajgarh, Pachhad, and Paonta Sahib. The Giri River divides the district into two almost equal parts: Giripar and Giriaar. The major towns are Nahan, Paonta Sahib, Rajgarh, and Shillai.

History

Demographics
According to the 2011 Census of India, Sirmaur district has a population of 529,855, which placed it 542nd in India (out of a total of 640). Its population growth rate over the decade 2001–2011 was 15.61%. Sirmaur had a sex ratio of 915 females for every 1000 males, and a literacy rate of 79.98%. 10.79% of the population lived in urban areas. Scheduled Castes and Scheduled Tribes made up 30.34% and 2.13% of the population respectively.

39.29% of the population of the district identified their first language as Hindi, 33.53% as Pahari, and 19.91% as Sirmauri. There were also speakers of Punjabi (3.88%), Nepali (0.94%), Haryanvi, (0.43%), and Tibetan (0.42%).

Politics 

 

|}

See also
 Gurudwara Paonta Sahib
 Battle of Bhangani

Notable people
 Yashwant Singh Parmar
 Mohit Chauhan
 Rahul Verma Rajput
 Siddharth Chauhan
 The Great Khali
 Rakesh Pandey

References

External links
 Official website
 Sirmour at a glance
 History of Sirmour
 Information about Sirmour District and its various places

 
History of Himachal Pradesh